The  is a Japanese literary award established in 1988 in memory of author Shūgorō Yamamoto. It was created and continues to be sponsored by the Shinchosha Publishing company, which published Yamamoto's Complete Works. The prize is awarded annually to a new work of fiction considered to exemplify the art of storytelling, by a five-person panel consisting of fellow authors. Winners receive ¥1 million.

Unlike the Mishima Yukio Prize, which was established at the same time and focuses on literary fiction, the Yamamoto Shūgorō Prize is more broad, encompassing a wide range of genre fiction that includes historical and period fiction, mysteries, fantasy, erotica, and more. Candidate works and prize winners for both prizes are typically announced in May each year and covered in national print media.

Notable winners have included Banana Yoshimoto, whose winning novel Goodbye Tsugumi was later published in English, erotic and romance novelist Misumi Kubo, and crime fiction and thriller author Kanae Minato. Several prize winners have gone on to win the Naoki Prize, including Riku Onda, Miyuki Miyabe, and Kaori Ekuni.

List of winners
An official list of winning and nominated works is maintained by Shinchosha, the prize sponsor.

Nominees available in English translation 
 1991 - Mariko Koike, A Cappella, trans. Juliet W. Carpenter (Thames River Press, 2013)
 2004 - Otsuichi, Zoo, trans. Terry Gallagher (Viz Media, 2009 / Shueisha English Edition, 2013)

See also 
 Japanese literature

References

External links 
 J'Lit | Awards : Yamamoto Shugoro Prize | Books from Japan 
 Yamamoto Shugoro Prize official site 

1988 establishments in Japan
Awards established in 1988
Japanese literary awards